Pangio apoda is a species of Cypriniformes fish in the genus Pangio.

Footnotes 

 

Pangio
Fish described in 2007